Billboard Decade-End is a series of music charts reflecting the most popular artists, albums, and songs in the United States throughout a decade. Billboard first published a decade-end ranking in the 1980s, based on the magazine reader's votes, with Madonna becoming the Pop Artist of the Decade. In December 1999, Billboard published decade-end lists based on statistical performances on weekly Billboard charts, with Mariah Carey being dubbed the Pop Artist of Decade. Other artists receiving the honor in the following decades are Eminem (2000s) and Drake (2010s).

1980s
In December 1989, Billboard published their very first lists of most popular artists, albums, and songs of the decade in various genres. The magazine readers submitted their votes through the December 23, 1989 edition of the magazine. A trophy was given to the winner of each categories. At the 55th anniversary of the Billboard Hot 100 in 2013, Billboard retrospectively named Madonna the Artist of the 1980s based on the chart performance during the decade. In 2019, Billboard also named "Physical" by Olivia Newton-John as the Top Song of the 1980s based on an inverse point system on the Hot 100 chart.

1990s
Mariah Carey accepted the trophy during the ceremony of the 1999 Billboard Music Awards held on December 8, 1999. In 2013, Billboard retrospectively named Carey the Hot 100 Artist of the 1990s based on the chart performance of her singles throughout the decade. "One Sweet Day", a duet by Mariah Carey and Boyz II Men, was named the Pop Single of the 1990s in the original issue. However, Billboard later published another two lists of top songs of the 1990s using different calculation, with "How Do I Live" by LeAnn Rimes topping the 2014 version and "Smooth" by Santana featuring Rob Thomas topping the 2019 version.

2000s
Eminem never accepted the trophy of the Artist of the Decade from the Billboard Music Awards due to the absence of the ceremony between 2007 and 2010.

2010s
Drake accepted the trophy during the ceremony of the 2021 Billboard Music Awards held on May 23, 2021.

References

Billboard (magazine)